The Holy Family Church, School, and Rectory in Mitchell, South Dakota  is a historic church complex at Kimball and Davison Sts., E. 2nd and E. 3rd Avenues.  It was built in 1906, 1912, and 1921 and was added to the National Register of Historic Places in 1976.

The church was built in 1906 at cost of $100,000.  The school, at cost of $150,000, was opened as Notre Dame Academy in 1912. The rectory was built in 1921 for $30,000.

References

Churches on the National Register of Historic Places in South Dakota
Gothic Revival church buildings in South Dakota
Tudor Revival architecture in South Dakota
Roman Catholic churches completed in 1921
Buildings and structures in Davison County, South Dakota
Mitchell, South Dakota
Churches in the Roman Catholic Diocese of Sioux Falls
National Register of Historic Places in Davison County, South Dakota
Houses on the National Register of Historic Places in South Dakota
20th-century Roman Catholic church buildings in the United States